Lykendra Johnson (born March 20, 1989) is a retired American professional basketball player for Olympiacos of the Greek Women's Basketball League. She has two children.

Career
She was named the Big Ten Defensive Player of the Year in 2011.

Michigan State statistics
Source

References

External links
 Lykendra Johnson – Michigan State Spartans
 

1989 births
Living people
American women's basketball players
Centers (basketball)
Olympiacos Women's Basketball players
Michigan State Spartans women's basketball players